Eslamabad (also Romanized as Eslāmābād; also known as Hajjiabad-e Olya (Persian:حاجي آباد عليا), also Romanized as Ḩājjīābād-e ʿOlyā) is a village in Borborud-e Gharbi Rural District, in the Central District of Aligudarz County, Lorestan Province, Iran. At the 2006 census, its population was 61, in 14 families.

References 

Towns and villages in Aligudarz County